Fyffe may refer to:

 Fyffe (surname)
 Fyffe, Alabama, a town in DeKalb County, Alabama, in the United States

See also
 Fyffes, a fruit company in Ireland
 Fyfe
 Fife (disambiguation)